Colias diva is a butterfly in the family Pieridae. It is found in Tibet and western China.

References

Butterflies described in 1891
diva
Butterflies of Asia